Marriage in Turkey may be performed by Muslim clerics (since 2017) or by civil officials, although only civil marriage is recognized. The legal age for marriage is 18 although 17-year-olds can marry with parental permission, and 16-year-olds with both parental permission and a court decision.

Same-sex marriage  
Same-sex marriage is not recognized in Turkey; according to a 2015 Ipsos survey, 27 percent of the population supports it.

References

External links

Turkey
Turkey
Law of Turkey
Marriage, unions and partnerships in Turkey